Gabardine was a band on Saddle Creek Records that was formed in 1996. Composed of members of Beep Beep, Broken Spindles, Head of Femur and The Faint, its members were Chris Hughes, Eric Bemberger, Ben Armstrong and Joel Petersen. Gabardine released one album, Gabardine, and had two tracks on the Saddle Creek sampler. The band broke up in summer 1998.

Discography
Gabardine is the only album by the band and was the 26th release by Saddle Creek Records.

Track listing
 Romance Is Better in Theory
 Learn to Sleep Alone
 For Future Grooms
 And Then the Drummer Flew Away
 Make-Up Won't Cover It
 It Wasn't the Movie That Made You Cry
 Do You Dream in Color?
 Will You Even Write?
 Schizophrenia

External links
Saddle Creek Records

Indie rock musical groups from Nebraska
Saddle Creek Records artists